This is a list of events from the year 1352 in Ireland.

Incumbent
Lord: Edward III

Events

Marriage of Elizabeth de Burgh, 4th Countess of Ulster, daughter and heiress of William Donn de Burgh, 3rd Earl of Ulster to Lionel of Antwerp, 1st Duke of Clarence

References